Rogers Pass, elevation , is a mountain pass in the Front Range of central Colorado. The pass crosses the continental divide in the James Peak Wilderness.

References

Landforms of Boulder County, Colorado
Landforms of Grand County, Colorado
Mountain passes of Colorado
Great Divide of North America